Gylermo Misaine Siereveld (born 13 March 2002) is a Dutch footballer who plays for ADO Den Haag as a central defender.

Career
Siereveld signed a 2 and a half year contract with NAC Breda on 30 November 2019. He had moved across amateur club JVOZ in his native Vlissingen the season before. He made his debut for NAC Breda in the Eerste Divisie on 20 October 2020, in a 0-4 lost home game against SC Cambuur.

NAC Breda only offered him  a one year contract extension and in June 2022 he signed for ADO Den Haag on a two year contract with options for two further seasons. Technical Director Daryl Janmaat said expectations were he would go straight into Dirk Kuyt’s first team squad.

References

External links
 

2002 births
Living people
Dutch footballers
Association football defenders
NAC Breda players
ADO Den Haag players
Eerste Divisie players